= Prince Air (India) =

- Key people: Sanket Raj Singh (Founder)
- Website: www.princeair.in

Prince Air is a proposed Indian airline based in New Delhi that offers members access to unlimited private flights for a fixed monthly fee. According to founder Sanket Raj Singh, the airline plans to commence operations once it has secured around 10,000 memberships with its fleet of aircraft fitted with 90 to 100 seats, similar to that of business and first-class offered on other commercial airlines.

== Destinations ==
The airline plans to operate to three destinations in India — Bengaluru, Delhi and Mumbai.
